Walnut Grove is a city in Redwood County, Minnesota, United States. The population was 871 at the 2010 census. Another name formerly associated with the area is Walnut Station.

History
Walnut Grove was platted in 1874. It was named for a grove of black walnut trees near the original town site. It was incorporated in 1879.

Walnut Grove is the site of the Laura Ingalls Wilder Museum, dedicated to the author of the Little House on the Prairie books. Wilder and her family lived in the area for a part of her childhood and the location is the setting for the Plum Creek part of the Little House book series. Charles Ingalls, her father, was the community's first justice and her only brother, Charles Frederick "Freddy" Ingalls (November 1, 1875 – August 27, 1876), was born in Walnut Grove. The name "Walnut Grove" was also used in the Little House on the Prairie television series, although the program was filmed in California.

Walnut Grove gained more than 250 residents between 2001 and 2006. The residents are Hmong. This has increased the population to nearly 900, and Hmong now comprise 42 percent of the students in the Westbrook-Walnut Grove School District.

Geography

Walnut Grove lies along U.S. Route 14, which connects it with Tracy to the west and Revere to the east. The town is located on Plum Creek.

Demographics

2010 census
At the 2010 census, the city had 871 people, 313 households and 210 families. The city's racial make-up was 63.4% White, 0.5% Native American, 35.0% Asian, 1.0% from other races and 0.1% from two or more races. Hispanic or Latino of any race were 2.1% of the population.

There were 313 households, of which 30.7% had children under the age of 18 living with them, 55.9% were married couples living together, 6.7% had a female householder with no husband present, 4.5% had a male householder with no wife present and 32.9% were non-families. 30.0% of all households were made up of individuals, and 17.9% had someone living alone who was 65 years of age or older. The average household size was 2.78 and the average family size was 3.53.

The median age was 36.8 years. 31.3% of the city's population was under age 18; 7.9% was from age 18 to 24, 18.3% was from age 25 to 44, 23.1% was from age 45 to 64 and 19.3% was age 65 or older. The city's sex make-up was 50.3% male and 49.7% female.

2000 census
At the 2000 census, the city had 599 people, 291 households and 178 families. The city's racial make-up was 97.66% White, 0.67% African American, 0.17% Native American, 0.17% Asian, 1.17% Pacific Islander and 0.17% from two or more races. Hispanic or Latino of any race were 0.17% of the population.

There were 291 households, of which 21.3% had children under the age of 18 living with them, 53.3% were married couples living together, 6.5% had a female householder with no husband present, and 38.8% were non-families. 36.4% of all households were made up of individuals and 22.7% had someone living alone who was 65 years of age or older. The average household size was 2.06 and the average family size was 2.67.

19.4% of the city's population was under age 18, 6.5% was from age 18 to 24, 22.7% was from age 25 to 44, 22.7% was from age 45 to 64 and 28.7% was age 65 or older. The median age was 46 years. For every 100 females, there were 89.6 males. For every 100 females age 18 and over, there were 90.2 males.

The city's median household income was $24,013 and the median family income was $34,167. Males had a median income of $24,750 and females $20,192. The per capita income was $15,637. About 5.0% of families and 9.6% of the population were below the poverty line, including 13.2% of those under age 18 and 10.1% of those age 65 or over.

Education

In the late 1990s, the Westbrook Wildcats and the Walnut Grove Loggers combined school districts and sports teams to form the Westbrook-Walnut Grove Chargers.

 Schools: one high school in Westbrook (Grades 7–12) and one elementary school in Walnut Grove (Grades K–6)
 Mascot: Chargers
 School colors: Red and silver

Notable people
 Norman R. DeBlieck, farmer and Minnesota state legislator
 Laura Ingalls Wilder, author
 Lester Mondale, Unitarian minister
 Leo Thorsness, Medal of Honor recipient

Sister cities

 Westbrook, Minnesota, and Walnut Grove are sister cities because Westbrook-Walnut Grove (WWG) Public Schools is distributed between both towns.
 De Smet, South Dakota, and Walnut Grove are sister cities because of the impact that Laura Ingalls Wilder has had on both of the cities.

References

External links
 Walnut Grove, Minnesota – city website
 Laura Ingalls Wilder Museum site

Cities in Redwood County, Minnesota
Populated places established in 1879
1879 establishments in Minnesota
Cities in Minnesota